Madeleine of Valois (10 August 1520 – 7 July 1537) was a French princess who briefly became Queen of Scotland in 1537 as the first wife of King James V. The marriage was arranged in accordance with the Treaty of Rouen, and they were married at Notre-Dame de Paris in January 1537, despite French reservations over her failing health. Madeleine died in July 1537, only six months after the wedding and less than two months after arriving in Scotland, resulting in her nickname, the "Summer Queen".

Early life 

Madeleine was born at the Château de Saint-Germain-en-Laye, France, the fifth child and third daughter of King Francis I of France and Claude, Duchess of Brittany, herself the eldest daughter of King Louis XII of France and Anne, Duchess of Brittany.

She was frail from birth, and grew up in the warm and temperate Loire Valley region of France, rather than at Paris, as her father feared that the cold would destroy her delicate health. Together with her sister, Margaret, she was raised by her aunt, Marguerite de Navarre until her father remarried and his new wife, Eleanor of Austria, took them into her own household. By her sixteenth birthday, she had contracted tuberculosis.

Marriage negotiations 
Three years before Madeleine's birth, the Franco-Scottish Treaty of Rouen was made to bolster the Auld Alliance after Scotland's defeat at the Battle of Flodden. A marriage between a French princess and the Scottish King was one of its provisions. In April 1530, John Stewart, Duke of Albany, was appointed commissioner to finalize the royal marriage between James V and Madeleine. However, as Madeleine did not enjoy good health, another French bride, Mary of Bourbon, was proposed.

James V contracted to marry Mary of Bourbon, and travelled to France in 1536 to meet her, but smitten with the delicate Madeleine, he asked Francis I for her hand in marriage. Fearing the harsh climate of Scotland would prove fatal to his daughter's already failing health, Francis I initially refused to permit the marriage.

James V continued to press Francis I for Madeleine's hand, and despite his reservations and nagging fears, Francis I reluctantly granted permission to the marriage only after Madeleine made her interest in marrying James very obvious. The court moved from Amboise to the Château de Blois, and the marriage contract was signed on 26 November 1536. They were married on 1 January 1537 at Notre Dame Cathedral in Paris. There was a banquet that night in the Louvre Palace.

Francis I also provided Madeleine with a generous dowry of 100,000 écu, and a further 30,000 francs settled on James V. According to the marriage contract made at Blois, Madeleine renounced her and any of her heirs' claims to the French throne. If James died first, Madeleine would retain for her lifetime assets including the Earldoms of Fife, Strathearn, Ross, and Orkney with Falkland Palace, Stirling Castle, and Dingwall Castle, with the Lordship of Galloway and Threave Castle.

Queen of Scots 

In March the couple moved Compiègne then stayed two nights at the Château de La Roche-Guyon. After months of festivities and celebrations, the couple left France for Scotland in May 1537. On 15 May English sailors sold fish to the Scottish and French fleet off Bamburgh Head. Madeleine's health deteriorated even further, and she was very sick when the royal pair landed in Scotland. They arrived at Leith at 10 o'clock on Whitsun-eve, 19 May 1537.

According to John Lesley the ships were laden with her possessions;"besides the Quenes Hienes furnitour, hinginis, and appareill, quhilk wes schippit at Newheavin and careit in Scotland, was also in hir awin cumpanye, transportit with hir majestie in Scotland, mony costlye jewells and goldin wark, precious stanis, orient pearle, maist excellent of any sort that was in Europe, and mony coistly abilyeaments for hir body, with mekill silver wark of coistlye cupbordis, cowpis, & plaite."

A list or inventory of wedding presents from Francis I also survives, including Arras tapestry, cloths of estate, rich beds, two cupboards of silver gilt plate, table carpets, and Persian carpets.

Some of her French courtiers came with her to Scotland and are included among the eleven named members of her household; her former governess, Anne de Boissy, Madame de Montreuil; Madame de Bren; her secretary, Jean de Langeac, Bishop of Limoges; master household, Jean de St Aubin; squire or valet Charles de Marconnay; the physician Master Partix; pages John Crammy and Pierre de Ronsard; furrier Gillan; butcher John Kenneth; barber Anthony.

Death 
Madeleine wrote to her father from Edinburgh on 8 June 1537 saying that she was better and her symptoms had diminished. James V had written to Francis I asking him to send the physician Master Francisco, and Madeleine wrote that he was now needed only to perfect her cure. She signed this letter "Magdalene de France". However, a month later, on 7 July 1537, (a month before her 17th birthday), Madeleine, the so-called "Summer Queen" of Scots, died in her husband's arms at Holyrood Palace. James V wrote to Francis I informing him of his daughter's death. 

Queen Madeleine was interred in Holyrood Abbey in Edinburgh, next to King James II of Scotland. Black mourning clothes were worn at her funeral, and an order was sent to the merchants of Dundee to provide black cloth. Her household servants were provided with "dule gowns", and horses at the procession had black cloths and trappings. The grave was desecrated by a mob in 1776 and her allegedly still beautiful head was stolen.

An inventory made of the king's goods in 1542 includes some of her clothes, furnishings for her chapel, and gold cups and other items made for her when she was a child.

Commemoration
Madeleine's marriage and death was commemorated by the poet David Lyndsay's Deploration of Deith of Quene Magdalene; the poem describes the pageantry of the marriage in France and Scotland:O Paris! Of all citeis principall!Quhilk did resave our prince with laud and glorie,Solempnitlie, throw arkis triumphall.    [arkis = arches]* * * * * *Thou mycht have sene the preparatiounMaid be the Thre Estaitis of ScotlandIn everilk ciete, castell, toure, and town* * * * * *Thow saw makand rycht costlie scaffaldingDepaynted weill with gold and asure fyne* * * * * *Disagysit folkis, lyke creaturis devyne,On ilk scaffold to play ane syndrie storieBot all in greiting turnit thow that glorie. [greiting = crying: thow = death]

Less than a year after her death, her husband married the widowed Mary of Guise, who had attended his wedding to Madeleine. Twenty years later, listed amongst the treasures in Edinburgh Castle were two little gold cups, an agate basin, a jasper vase, and crystal jug given to Madeleine when she was a child in France.

Ancestry

References

External links
 Portrait of Madeleine by Corneille de Lyon, Agnews

|-

1520 births
1537 deaths
1537 in Scotland
People from Saint-Germain-en-Laye
House of Valois-Angoulême
French princesses
Scottish royal consorts
16th-century deaths from tuberculosis
Scottish people of French descent
Burials at Holyrood Abbey
Tuberculosis deaths in Scotland
Court of James V of Scotland
French people of Italian descent
French people of Breton descent
House of Stuart
16th-century French people
16th-century Scottish people
16th-century French women
16th-century Scottish women
Daughters of kings